The Muskegon Risers are an American soccer team based in Muskegon, Michigan. The team participates in the National Premier Soccer League for its outdoor season in the summer and Major Arena Soccer League 2 for its indoor season in the winter. Kehren Stadium and Mercy Health Arena are home to the Risers for their outdoor and indoor seasons respectively.  Ben Ritsema is the head coach of the Muskegon Risers Men's indoor team, Debbie Pekel is the head coach of the Women's indoor team, and Steven Jones is the head coach of the eSports team. Both head coaching positions for the organization's outdoor teams are currently open.

In April 2019, it was announced that the team will play in the National Premier Soccer League Great Lakes Conference beginning in 2020.
On November 2, 2017, the club announced that it would take part in the inaugural season of Major Arena Soccer League 2.

Origin of the name
'Risers' name was inspired by the 'Muskegon, Together Rising' sculpture that stands in the heart of downtown Muskegon.

Year-by-year

Outdoor

Indoor

Gallery

References

United Premier Soccer League teams
Soccer clubs in Michigan
2014 establishments in Michigan
Association football clubs established in 2014
Premier Arena Soccer League teams
Sports in Muskegon, Michigan